John Cusack (1925 – 11 August 2002) was an Irish hurler who played as a full-back for the Waterford senior team.

Cusack, after an uneventful underage career, played for the senior team throughout the 1940s and the 1950s. During that time he won one All-Ireland medal and one Munster medal.

At club level Cusack played with Rathgormack Winning Senior Hurling Medal with Clonea in 1952 against T. F. Meaghers on a Scoreline of 1–10 to 2-01

References

1925 births
2002 deaths
Clonea hurlers
Waterford inter-county hurlers
All-Ireland Senior Hurling Championship winners